In computational learning theory in mathematics, a concept over a domain X is a total Boolean function over X. A concept class is a class of concepts. Concept classes are a subject of computational learning theory.

Concept class terminology frequently appears in model theory associated with probably approximately correct (PAC) learning. In this setting, if one takes a set Y as a set of (classifier output) labels, and X is a set of examples, the map , i.e. from examples to classifier labels (where  and where c is a subset of X), c is then said to be a concept. A concept class  is then a collection of such concepts.

Given a class of concepts C, a subclass D is reachable if there exists a sample s such that D contains exactly those concepts in C that are extensions to s. Not every subclass is reachable.

Background 

Two samples are consistent if they agree on the intersection of their domains.

Examples 
Suppose that . Then:

 the subclass  is reachable with the sample ;
 the subclass , which consists of the singleton sets, is not reachable.

Applications 
Let  be some concept class. The fingerprint dimension  of the entire concept class  is the least positive integer  such that every reachable subclass  contains a concept that is -good for it. This quantity can be used to bound the minimum number of equivalence queries needed to learn a class of concepts according to the following inequality:.

References 

Computational learning theory